Jack Kennedy (1906 – after 1932) was an English footballer who played as an inside left for Blyth Spartans, Sheffield United, Tranmere Rovers, Exeter City and Torquay United.

Kennedy joined Torquay on November 9th, 1933 to enable Torquay to field a side at Reading on Nov 10th. T. Walters also signed for Torquay from Exeter on the same date and for same reason. Both played on 10th November.

References

1906 births
Year of death missing
People from Blyth, Northumberland
Association football inside forwards
English footballers
Blyth Spartans A.F.C. players
Sheffield United F.C. players
Tranmere Rovers F.C. players
Exeter City F.C. players
Torquay United F.C. players
English Football League players
Footballers from Northumberland